Mount Whymper is a mountain located on Vancouver Island, British Columbia.

History
The mountain is named in 1864 for Frederick Whymper who accompanied Robert Brown on the Vancouver Island Exploring Expedition

There is another Mount Whymper in British Columbia, named for Frederick's brother Edward Whymper.

References

One-thousanders of British Columbia
Vancouver Island Ranges
Kootenay Land District